Te Arani Moana Daniels is a New Zealand professional boxer.

She is a three time New Zealand National Professional Boxing champion, holding the New Zealand Professional Boxing Association Light Heavyweight title, Pro Box NZ Super Middleweight title, and Pro Box NZ Light Heavyweight title. Daniels has peaked in the rankings 2nd in WBA in the Light Heavyweight division, 1st on BoxRec, 2nd on ESPN, 1st in IBO, and 1st in WBC. Daniels fought for a world title on March 30, 2019, fighting Geovana Peres for the WBO Light heavyweight title.

Early life 
Daniels is one of nine siblings. At the age of 14, Daniels' younger brother died of leukemia at the age of 11. This led to Daniels turning to drugs and alcohol with contemplation of suicide. She got inspired by her sister Caroline who was already fighting as an amateur boxer. Since then Lani turned her life around and became a mental health nurse. She fights alongside her sister Caroline with both of them being amateur and later on professional boxers.

Amateur career 
Daniels originally started boxing to lose weight alongside her sister. Daniels began her career in the amateur division. She first started with her sister Caroline in Hamilton under the coach Dion McNabney at Nabby's Boxing GYM. Daniels is a two-time New Zealand amateur boxing champion, winning the titles in 2014 and 2015.

Professional career

Debut to multiple national champion 2017 – 2018 
In September 2017, Daniels made her professional debut against another debutant boxer Trish Vaka on the Big Bash Boxing Promotion. Lani Daniels won bout by Unanimous Decision. In November 2017, Daniels fought Vaka again in a rematch, but this time for the vacant NZPBA Light Heavyweight Title. Daniels won the bout by unanimous decision, winning all of the scheduled rounds by two judges and picking up her first title.

In March 2018, Daniels took on another New Zealand champion Geovana Peres. Peres at the time before the belt held both New Zealand National Boxing Federation and Professional Boxing Commission Light Heavyweight titles. Geovana Peres was defending her PBCNZ Light Heavyweight title in the bout against Daniels. It was a close bout, however Daniels lost bout by split decision, suffering her first professional defeat. In July 2018, Daniels defended her NZPBA title against former world ranked boxer Nailini Helu. The bout went the full 8 rounds with Lani Daniels almost winning all the rounds, winning the bout by unanimous decision retaining the title. In September 2018, Daniels fought Tessa Tualevao for the vacant Pro Box NZ Super Middleweight title in Cambridge, New Zealand. Daniels won the bout by unanimous decision, winning her second professional title.

World title contender, Tualevao Rivalry 2019 

On 17 December 2018, it was announced that Daniels will be going against Geovana Peres in a rematch for the WBO light heavyweight title. The event took place on 30 March 2019 in Auckland, New Zealand. Daniels lost the bout by unanimous decision.

On 19 June 2019, it was announced that a rematch between Daniels and Tessa Tualevao would happen on August 2, 2019, at ABA Stadium for the vacant New Zealand Professional Boxing Commission Female middleweight title. During the announcement it was revealed that Daniels was still ranked 5th on the WBA world rankings. This was the first time that Daniels fought in the middleweight division in her professional career. The fight reached the full 8 round but the bout ended in a draw, leaving the belt to remain vacant. On 13 August 2019, Bruce Glozier announced that the third bout between Daniels and Tessa Tualevao would happen on October 4, 2019, at Sky City Convention Centre. This will be for the vacant New Zealand Professional Boxing Commission Female middleweight title. This fight will be on the undercard of the Geovana Peres vs. Claire Hafner World title fight night.

Comeback, Receiving Call outs 2021 – 2022 
On 27 February 2021, Daniels was scheduled to make her in-ring return to fight Alrie Meleisea for a major world title. Unfortunately, there were a lot of problems with behind the scenes which went from being for a world title, to an intercontinental title, to a regional title, to it being a national title. Eventually the fight got called off altogether due to  boxing politics and communication breakdowns behind the scenes.

On 4 September, Daniels was originally scheduled to return to the ring, to fight at Eden Park. Unfortunately, due to COVID-19 pandemic in New Zealand, the fight got postponed. The fight ended up happening on 30 April 2022 at ABA Stadium against professional rugby player Sequita Hemingway.  Daniels won the fight by unanimous decision. A rematch was scheduled to take place on 24 June at The Plaza in Putāruru. However, Hemingway pulled out of the fight shortly after it was announced. Daniels will now take on amateur boxer Tinta Smith for the New Zealand National (Pro Box NZ version) light heavyweight title. Daniels won the fight against  Smith by unanimous decision with the fight being reported as very close. After the fight, it was reported that Daniels struggled with her camp for the fight due to having Covid at the beginning of the camp, a leg injury, the flu closer to the fight and a family member suddenly a month before the fight. In July 2022, Daniels received a WBA rankings of 3rd in the light heavyweight division. Shortly afterwards, Daniels received another increase in the rankings to not only 2nd in the WBA, but also 1st in the WBC. In November 2022, South African national women's champion Razel Mohammed took to social media demanding a fight against Daniels.

World title fight, Hemingway rematch, Alrie Meleisea Rivalry 2023 

On 9 December, Alrie Meleisea defeated Sequita Hemingway for the Pro Box NZ heavyweight title. After her fight, Meleisea asked if she would be interested in a world title fight against Daniels. She replied “Anytime, anywhere, any place,” officially calling out Daniels. In January 2023, it was announced that Daniels was in negotiations with Meleisea team for a potencial world title fight in May. Also in January, it was announced that negotiations were happening to have a tuneup fight against Sequita Hemingway before the world title fight. On 14 January, it was announced that Daniels' fight against Sequita Hemingway was confirmed for 10 March at ABA Stadium for the historical vacant ANBF Australasian heavyweight title. This will be a warm up fight for the world title. On the same day it was confirmed that Daniels would take on Meleisea for the first-ever IBF World womens heavyweight title on 27 May at Eventfinda Stadium. The intentions for the Hemingway fight is not only to be a tune up fight but also to help pay the bills for the world title fight. On March 10th, Daniels won her fight against Sequita Hemingway by unanimous decision, winning the ANBF Australasian Heavyweight title.

Personal life 
Daniels is a descendant of Te Tai Tokerau. She is from the Iwi Ngāti Hine which is part of the wider Ngāpuhi. She also belongs to the Hapū Te Orewai. When she isn't boxing, Daniels is a mental health nurse. She currently resides in the small town of Pipiwai. Outside of her own training, Daniels trains her family for free, to give back to the youth and community.

Boxing Titles

Amateur Boxing
 Boxing NZ
 New Zealand Amateur Light Heavyweight (2014)
 New Zealand Amateur Middleweight (2015)
 Bobby Johnson Cup (Most Scientific boxer at the 2015 New Zealand national amateur championships)

Professional Boxing
 New Zealand Professional Boxing Association
 New Zealand National Light Heavyweight title (171 Ibs)
 Pro Box NZ
 New Zealand National Super Middleweight title (167 Ibs)
 New Zealand National Light Heavyweight title
 Australian National Boxing Federation
 Australasian Heavyweight title

Professional boxing record

Basketball 

Between 2016 and 2018, Daniels played basketball for the Te Tai Tokerau Northland Phoenix, competing at the New Zealand Womens Basketball Championships. Daniels was the Phoenix team lead scorer in 2017. Daniels competed in two National Championship tournaments. In 2017, the Phoenix finished eleventh place on the standings. In 2018, the team competed in the tier 2 conference, coming in fourth place.

Awards and recognitions
 Boxing New Zealand
 2015 Bobby Johnson Cup Most Scientific boxer (Won)
 Northland Sports Awards
 2018 Female Boxer of the Year (Won)
 2018 Fireco Sportswomen of the Year (Nominated)
 2022 Fireco Sportswoman of the Year (Pending)
 New Zealand Boxing Awards
 2019 Female boxer of the year (Nominated)
 2019 New Zealand Fight of the year (Won)
 2019 Best looking female boxer of the year (Won)
 Te Tai Tokerau Māori Sports Awards
 2023 Te Tohu TaKaro Toa Wahine Outstanding Sportswoman Award (Nominated)

References 

Year of birth missing (living people)
Living people
New Zealand women boxers
New Zealand professional boxing champions
New Zealand Māori sportspeople
Sportspeople from Whangārei
Light-heavyweight boxers
Boxers from Northland